Șișcani is a commune in Nisporeni District, Moldova. It is composed of three villages: Drojdieni, Odaia and Șișcani.

References

Communes of Nisporeni District